Spinipocregyes is a genus of longhorn beetles of the subfamily Lamiinae, containing the following species:

 Spinipocregyes laosensis Breuning, 1963
 Spinipocregyes nigrescens Breuning, 1949
 Spinipocregyes rufosignatus Breuning, 1968

References

Mesosini